Oxford Junction is a city in Jones County, Iowa, United States. The population was 424 at the time of the 2020 census. It is part of the Cedar Rapids Metropolitan Statistical Area.

History
Oxford Junction was platted in 1871, at the time the now-defunct railroad was built. The town is named for its location at the junction of two branches of the Chicago, Milwaukee, St. Paul and Pacific Railroad.

Geography
Oxford Junction is located at  (41.983203, -90.954480).

Demographics

2010 census
At the 2010 census there were 496 people, 223 households, and 141 families living in the city. The racial makup of the city was 99.0% White, 0.6% Native American, and 0.4% Asian.
Of the 223 households 26.0% had children under the age of 18 living with them, 46.2% were married couples living together, 13.0% had a female householder with no husband present, 4.0% had a male householder with no wife present, and 36.8% were non-families. 31.8% of households were one person and 18.4% were one person aged 65 or older. The average household size was 2.22 and the average family size was 2.75.

The median age was 45.5 years. 22.2% of residents were under the age of 18; 7.4% were between the ages of 18 and 24; 19% were from 25 to 44; 29.2% were from 45 to 64; and 22.2% were 65 or older. The gender makeup of the city was 50.0% male and 50.0% female.

2000 census
At the 2000 census there were 573 people, 236 households, and 151 families living in the city. The racial makup of the city was 98.95% White, 0.17% Native American, 0.17% Asian, and 0.70% from two or more races. Hispanic or Latino of any race were 0.17%.

Of the 236 households 33.5% had children under the age of 18 living with them, 50.4% were married couples living together, 7.6% had a female householder with no husband present, and 36.0% were non-families. 32.6% of households were one person and 22.9% were one person aged 65 or older. The average household size was 2.43 and the average family size was 3.09.

The age distribution was 27.2% under the age of 18, 8.0% from 18 to 24, 24.1% from 25 to 44, 19.7% from 45 to 64, and 20.9% 65 or older. The median age was 39 years. For every 100 females, there were 89.1 males. For every 100 females age 18 and over, there were 84.5 males.

The median household income was $30,417 and the median family income  was $35,625. Males had a median income of $26,875 versus $17,333 for females. The per capita income for the city was $13,805. About 18.5% of families and 18.9% of the population were below the poverty line, including 24.0% of those under age 18 and 12.1% of those age 65 or over.

Education
It is within the Midland Community School District and hosts the district's sole elementary school. The Oxford Junction district merged into the Midland district on July 1, 1995.

Notable people

References

Cities in Jones County, Iowa
Cities in Iowa
Cedar Rapids, Iowa metropolitan area